The Women's 200m Individual Medley (IM) event at the 2007 Pan American Games took place at the Maria Lenk Aquatic Park in Rio de Janeiro, Brazil, with the semifinals being stage on July 19 and the final a day later.

Medalists

Results

References
agendapan
For the Record, Swimming World Magazine, September 2007 (p. 48+49)

Medley, Women's 200
2007 in women's swimming